The Airdrome Bleriot Model XI, also referred to as the Airdrome Bleriot XI, is an American amateur-built aircraft, designed and produced by Airdrome Aeroplanes, of Holden, Missouri. The aircraft is supplied as a kit for amateur construction.

The aircraft is available as a full-scale or 3/4 replica of the French Blériot XI 1909 pioneer aircraft that was designed by Louis Blériot and used to fly across the English Channel on 25 July 1909. The replica is built from modern materials and powered by modern engines.

Design and development
The Airdrome Bleriot Model XI features a cable-braced monoplane layout, a single-seat open cockpit, fixed conventional landing gear and a single engine in tractor configuration.

The aircraft is made from steel and aluminum, with its flying surfaces covered in doped aircraft fabric. The standard engine used on the full-scale version is the  four stroke Rotec R2800 radial engine, while the 3/4 scale version uses a Volkswagen air-cooled engine. Building time from the factory-supplied full scale kit is estimated at 375 hours by the manufacturer.

Operational history
Three examples of the full scale and one 3/4 kit had been completed by December 2011.

Specifications (Full Scale Bleriot Model XI)

References

Homebuilt aircraft
Single-engined tractor aircraft
Replica aircraft